The Economic Policy Institute (EPI) is a 501(c)(3) non-profit American, left-leaning think tank based in Washington, D.C., that carries out economic research and analyzes the economic impact of policies and proposals. Affiliated with the labor movement the EPI is usually described as presenting a left-leaning and pro-union viewpoint on public policy issues. Since 2021, the EPI has been led by economist Heidi Shierholz, a former Chief Economist of the Department of Labor.

The EPI has a sister organization, the EPI Policy Center, which is a 501(c)(4) group.

History
EPI was founded in 1986 by economists Jeff Faux, Lester Thurow, Ray Marshall, Barry Bluestone, Robert Reich, and Robert Kuttner. Since 2021,  Heidi Shierholz has served as the EPI's president. Shierholz succeeded Thea Lea, who was appointed by President Joe Biden to a position in the Department of Labor.

Policy proposals
EPI supported Bernie Sanders's Medicare for All proposal. In a March 2020 policy paper, it argued that the loss of jobs in the insurance industry and in administering the current system would be small, within the normal job churn, and easily absorbed by the economy. The paper argued that this cost would be outweighed by the benefits of universal health care and in small business formation. The EPI has also released policy papers analyzing U.S. investment in early childhood education.

In July 2012, EPI and the AFL–CIO, Center for Community Change, Leadership Conference on Civil and Human Rights, National Council of La Raza and SEIU proposed a budget plan titled Prosperity Economics, a counter to the Republican Party's Path to Prosperity budget plan. The Prosperity Economics plan suggests that major public investment in areas like infrastructure is needed to jump-start the economy.

In response to the debate over the United States fiscal cliff, EPI economist Josh Bivens advocated taxing the rich and wrote, "Given this rise in [income] inequality, it makes sense that much of the future burden of reducing budget deficits should be borne by those who have benefited the most from economic trends in recent decades."

Funding
Eight labor unions made a five-year funding pledge to EPI at its inception: AFSCME, United Auto Workers, United Steelworkers, United Mine Workers, International Association of Machinists, Communications Workers of America, Service Employees International Union, and United Food and Commercial Workers Union. According to EPI, about 29% of its funding between 2005 and 2009 was supplied by labor unions and about 53% came from foundation grants.

In the 1980s, EPI took money from the Tobacco Institute, a now-defunct tobacco industry trade group, to oppose excise taxes on the tobacco industry's behalf. The Tobacco Institute worked with groups like EPI "to support the release of studies, editorials, press briefings, and testimony against regressive excise taxes" that would negatively impact the tobacco industry's bottom line if passed.

References

 
Political and economic think tanks in the United States
Progressive organizations in the United States
Non-profit organizations based in Washington, D.C.
Think tanks established in 1986
1986 establishments in Washington, D.C.
501(c)(3) organizations